Charles Peter Huntley Knaggs OBE, is a colonel in the British Army.

Biography
As commander of the First Battalion, Irish Guards, he was Field Officer in Waiting during the Trooping the Colour ceremony in 2005. He was deployed with his battalion to Helmand Province, Afghanistan, shortly thereafter as part of the NATO force providing security.

He was awarded the Order of the British Empire in the 2006 Birthday Honours.

He became the Clerk to the Worshipful Company of Ironmongers in July 2018.

References

Living people
Irish Guards officers
British Army personnel of the War in Afghanistan (2001–2021)
Officers of the Order of the British Empire
Alumni of Falcon College
Year of birth missing (living people)